Salvia glutinosa, the glutinous sage, sticky sage, Jupiter's sage, or Jupiter's distaff, is a herbaceous perennial plant belonging to the family Lamiaceae.

Description
The leaves are deciduous, toothed, pointed, tomentose and glandular. With the first frosts, foliage disappears and the plant is ready to overwinter in dormant buds.

All parts of the plant are covered with sticky glandular hairs, especially the lime-green calyces and the flowers, resulting in the name "glutinosa". These sticky hairs probably have a protective function against predators. Salvia glutinosa is the main host plant of the plant bug Macrotylus quadrilineatus, that feeds on the juices of the plant and on small insects entrapped on this sticky sage.

Flowers grow in whorls of two to six, with pale yellow flowers speckled with maroon. The flowers have two stamens and a bell-shaped calyx. The flowering period extends from June to September.

This species contains salvinorin A at 39 micrograms per gram of plant material.

Distribution
This plant is native to Central and East Europe, and West Asia. It is grown in gardens.

Habitat

Gallery

References

External links
 

glutinosa
Flora of Europe
Flora of Western Asia
Plants described in 1753
Taxa named by Carl Linnaeus